Hunhezhan is a station on Line 9 of the Shenyang Metro. It is close to Hunhe railway station. The station opened on 25 May 2019.

The under construction Line 6 will serve this station in the future.

Station Layout

References 

Railway stations in China opened in 2019
Shenyang Metro stations